Nikola Šaranović may refer to:
 Nikola Šaranović (sport shooter)
 Nikola Šaranović (basketball)